The Tescou is a tributary of the Tarn in the basin of the Garonne in southern France. It flows  through the departments of Tarn, Tarn-et-Garonne and Haute-Garonne.

The source is near Gaillac in the Massif Central, and its confluence with the Tarn is near Montauban in the Tarn-et-Garonne department in the Occitanie administrative region.

In 2014 construction work began on the Sivens Dam (Barrage de Sivens), to supply  irrigation for local farms.

On 25 October 2014, Rémi Fraisse, a 21-year-old student protesting against the Sivens Dam across the Tescou, was killed after being hit in the back by a grenade, sparking further violent protests.

References

External links

French Waterways - The Tarn Navigation guide to the lower 40 km.
http://www.gorgesdutarn.net/?lang=en

Rivers of France
Rivers of Occitania (administrative region)
Rivers of Tarn (department)
Rivers of Tarn-et-Garonne
Rivers of Haute-Garonne